Eniola 'Eni' Gesinde is a rugby union footballer and current Newcastle Falcons senior academy member.

Eni was born in Lagos, Nigeria, before moving to England as a child.
He represented Yorkshire at U-18s level before joining the Newcastle Falcons academy. Using his natural power and pace he scored a number of tries for the Development team.

Eni has captained the Falcons development team on a number of occasions and has recently led the Newcastle Falcons sevens team to a hat trick of victories in the Scottish Borders sevens, winning the Hawick, Melrose and Langham sevens titles with Gesinde playing an integral role throughout.

On 4 September 2006, Eni was named as part of the extended England sevens squad for the 06/07 season by Mike Friday.

On Sunday 17 September Eni made his Newcastle Falcons 1st team debut, coming off the bench in the 72nd minute during the 44-20 defeat to Saracens.

References

External links
Newcastle profile

Alumni of Northumbria University
1982 births
Living people
English rugby union players
Newcastle Falcons players
English people of Nigerian descent
Black British sportspeople
Rugby union locks